Charkop Assembly constituency  is one of the 288 Vidhan Sabha (Legislative Assembly) constituencies in Maharashtra state in western India. It is a segment of the Mumbai North Lok Sabha constituency.

Overview
Charkop (चारकोप) constituency is one of the 26 Vidhan Sabha constituencies located in the Mumbai Suburban district.

Charkop is part of the Mumbai North Lok Sabha constituency along with five other Vidhan Sabha segments, namely Borivali, Magathane, Dahisar, Kandivali East and Malad West in the Mumbai Suburban district.

Members of Vidhan Sabha

Election results

2019 result

2014 result

2009 result

See also
 Charkop
 List of constituencies of Maharashtra Vidhan Sabha

References

Assembly constituencies of Mumbai
Politics of Mumbai Suburban district
Assembly constituencies of Maharashtra